Black Forest Bluegrass is a recording of the music of Peter Schickele under his comic pseudonym of P. D. Q. Bach, featuring the composer  and "a bluegrass band with a Baroque orchestra, a wind octet with toys, a commercial with a snake — this album has it all!" The album was released on Vanguard Records in 1979.

Performers
Professor Peter Schickele, bass, conductor, snake (that's an instrument)
The New York Pick-Up Ensemble, Robert Bernhardt, conductor
John Ferrante, tenor
Eric Weisberg, mandolin and harmonica
Bill Keith, banjo and harmonica
Happy Traum, guitar and harmonica
Donald "Don" Palma, bass and harmonica
According to the liner notes on the album, the performers pictured on the cover are Tommy Mann and his Magic Mountain Boys.

Track listing 
Cantata: Blaues Gras (Bluegrass Cantata), S. 6 string 
Recitative and Aria: "Blaues Gras"
Recitative: "O"
Aria: "Du Bist Im Land"
Recitative: "O"
Duet: "Ich Sehe"
Chorale: "Ich Gehe"
Duet: "Sag' Mir"
No-no Nonette for assorted winds and toys, S. 86
First Movement
Second Movement
Third Movement
Fourth Movement
Last Movement
"Hear Me Through" from Diverse Ayres on Sundrie Notions, S. 99 44/100

Sources
P.D.Q. Bach: Black Forest Bluegrass

P. D. Q. Bach albums
1979 albums
1970s comedy albums
Vanguard Records albums